Wasted is a six-episode British comedy TV series. It was written and created by Jon Foster and J.D. Lamont for E4. It began broadcasting with two episodes on 26 July 2016. The series' style has been compared to that of Spaced.

Premise
After failing to make it as a DJ, Kent returns to his home village of Neston Berry (a fictional West Country village located somewhere near Yeovil) where he reunites with three school friends: Morpheus, Sarah and Alison. They reside at 'Stoned Henge', a souvenir shop/tattoo parlour, and have various aimless adventures while trying to stave off boredom. These adventures mostly involve getting drunk or smoking cannabis. Sean Bean plays Morpheus' imaginary spirit guide, a fictionalised version of himself but dressed as his character from Game of Thrones.

Cast
Danny Kirrane as Morpheus (real name, Paul Durkin), co-owner of the 'Stoned Henge' bong shop.
Rose Reynolds as Sarah Durkin, sister of Morpheus, co-owner of the bong shop who wants to see the world.
Gwyneth Keyworth as Alison, tattoo artist and the oblivious object of Morpheus' affection.
Dylan Edwards as Kent, former boyfriend of Sarah, who returned to his hometown village having failed at being a DJ in Bristol.
Sean Bean, as a spirit guide/Morpheus' subconscious in the form of a mix between a fictional version of Sean as well as two roles he's performed : Boromir and Ned Stark.
Tom Canton as Holy Man (real name, Chris), a drug dealer and on-again/off-again boyfriend of Alison.
Harrie Hayes as Verian,  enthusiastic admirer of Morpheus and organiser of the Berry Man Festival.
Jamie Demetriou as Alistair, owner of the Other Pub. 
Matthew Jacobs Morgan as Jason, Kent's colleague at Birdland.
Tony Miller as Mick the Druid.

Episodes

References

External links

2016 British television series debuts
2016 British television series endings
2010s British sitcoms
E4 sitcoms
English-language television shows
Television shows set in Somerset